HMS Ready was a destroyer of the M class that served with the Royal Navy during First World War. Launched by Thornycroft in 1916, the vessel was the one of two similar ships ordered as part of the Fifth War Construction Programme. They differed from the remainder of the M class in having more powerful engines. The design was used as the basis for the subsequent five ships of the  also built by the yard. Ready operated within the Grand Fleet until it was disbanded at the end of the war. The vessel was credited with helping to sink a German Q-ship in 1917. After the war, the destroyer was initially transferred to HMNB Portsmouth, but was retired and sold to be broken up in 1926 after almost a decade of service as part of a preparation for a fleet of new destroyers.

Design and development

Ready was one of two  destroyers ordered by the British Admiralty from John I. Thornycroft & Company in May 1915 as part of the Fifth War Construction Programme. Ready and  differed from the Admiralty design in having more powerful engines, which gave them a higher potential speed. Thornycroft had previously delivered four other M-class destroyers to the Admiralty to slightly different specifications, and together they are considered to be a single class.

Displacement was  normal and  full load. Three funnels were fitted, the centre one being wider than the others, a feature shared with the R-class destroyers designed by Thornycroft.

Armament consisted of three single QF  Mk IV guns on the ship's centreline, with one on the forecastle, one aft and one between the second and third funnels. Four  torpedoes torpedoes were carried in two twin rotating mounts. By 1920, the ship was equipped with a single QF 2-pounder  "pom-pom" anti-aircraft gun. The vessel had a complement of 82 officers and ratings.

Construction and service
Ready was laid down on 2 September 1915 and launched on 26 August 1916. Once completed in October 1916, the ship joined the Grand Fleet, allocated to the Fifteenth Destroyer Flotilla. The flotilla was involved in anti-submarine patrols during June 1917 which, although involving twelves attacks, did not lead to the destruction of any submarines. From 31 October to 2 November 1917, the 15th Flotilla made a sortie into the Kattegat, sinking the German Q-ship K (also known as Kronprinz Wilhelm) on 2 November and nine trawlers.

Ready continued to serve with the Fifteenth Destroyer Flotilla until the end of the war. When the Grand Fleet was disbanded, Ready was allocated to the defence flotilla at HMNB Portsmouth. However, in 1923, the Navy decided to scrap many of the older destroyers in preparation for the introduction of newer and larger vessels. The destroyer was sold to King to be broken up at Garston, Liverpool on 13 July 1926.

Pennant numbers

References

Citations

Bibliography

 
 
 
 

 

 
 
 
 

1916 ships
Thornycroft M-class destroyers
Ships built in Southampton
World War I destroyers of the United Kingdom